The 1973 Maine Black Bears football team was an American football team that represented the University of Maine as a member of the Yankee Conference during the 1973 NCAA Division II football season. In its seventh season under head coach Walter Abbott, the team compiled a 3–7 record (2–4 against conference opponents) and finished sixth out of seven teams in the Yankee Conference. Andrew Mellow, John O'Rourke Jr., and Jack Lamborghini were the team captains.

Schedule

References

Maine
Maine Black Bears football seasons
Maine Black Bears football